Chitchanok Pulsabsakul (born 4 November 1993) is a Thai weighlifter. She competed at the 2013 World Championships in the Women's +75 kg, winning the bronze medal.

Doping
Pulsabsakul served a two-year doping ban from 6 July 2011 to 6 July 2013 after testing positive for Methandienone.
In January 2019 she was issued a four-year doping ban until January 2023 after testing positive for 5a- androstane-3a, 17 bdiol (5aAdiol) and 5b-androstane-3a, 17 b-diol (5bAdiol).

References

External links
 
 

1993 births
Living people
Asian Games medalists in weightlifting
Doping cases in weightlifting
Chitchanok Pulsabsakul
World Weightlifting Championships medalists
Chitchanok Pulsabsakul
Weightlifters at the 2010 Summer Youth Olympics
Weightlifters at the 2010 Asian Games
Weightlifters at the 2014 Asian Games
Chitchanok Pulsabsakul
Medalists at the 2014 Asian Games
Universiade medalists in weightlifting
Weightlifters at the 2018 Asian Games
Chitchanok Pulsabsakul
Medalists at the 2013 Summer Universiade
Chitchanok Pulsabsakul